Aspergillus niveoglaucus is a species of fungus in the genus Aspergillus. It is from the Aspergillus section. The species was first described in 1941. It has been reported to produce asperflavin, auroglaucin, bisanthrons, dihydroauroglaucin, echinulins, emodin, erythroglaucin, flavoglaucin, mycophenolic acid (tentatively identified), neoechinulins, physcion, questin, questinol, siderin, tetracyclic, and tetrahydroauroglaucin.

References 

neniveoglaucus
Fungi described in 1941
Taxa named by Charles Thom